The Rattazzi I government of Italy held office from 3 March 1862 until 8 December 1862, a total of 280 days, or 9 months and 5 days.

History
In consequence of the negotiations for the cession of Nice and Savoy to France, which cession Urbano Rattazzi opposed, he again retired in January 1860. On changing his views on this policy, he became president of the lower chamber in the first Italian Parliament, and in March 1862 succeeded Ricasoli in the government, retaining for himself the portfolios of Foreign Affairs and of the Interior. However, in consequence of his policy of repression towards Garibaldi at Aspromonte, he was driven from office in the following December.

Government parties
The government was composed by the following parties:

Composition

References

Italian governments
1862 establishments in Italy